Paddy Breslin is a former association football player who represented New Zealand at international level.

Breslin played two official A-international matches for the New Zealand, both against New Caledonia, the first a 0–4 loss on 8 November 1967, the second a 1–3 loss on 8 October 1968, Breslin scoring New Zealand's goal in that game.

Breslin died on 19 July 2020.

References

External links
https://www.stuff.co.nz/sport/football/300062388/former-new-zealand-footballer-paddy-breslin-dies

Year of birth missing (living people)
Living people
New Zealand association footballers
New Zealand international footballers
Association football forwards